Gandiwind is located in the southwest part of Amritsar district of the Indian state of Punjab.
Gandiwind is a village near the Pakistani border (6 km) and a famous singer named Satnam Sagar resides here.

Villages in Amritsar district